8H or 8-H can refer to:

GCR Class 8H, a class of 0-8-4T steam tank locomotives
Studio 8H, NBC studio in the Comcast Building where Saturday Night Live is filmed
8H, a designation for the West Virginia-Western Maryland Synod
SCELBI-8H, a hardware model sold with SCELBI
Typ 8H, a model of  Audi A4
HJ-8H, a model of  HJ-8 anti-tank missile 
IATA code for Highland  Airways
former IATA code for Harbour Air
recalled IATA code for Equaflight Service

See also
H8 (disambiguation)